Phyllocnistis voutei is a moth of the family Gracillariidae, known from Java, Indonesia.

The hostplant for the species is an unidentified species of Loranthus. They mine the leaves of their host plant. The mine is located on the underside of the leaf surface.

References

Phyllocnistis
Endemic fauna of Indonesia